{{Infobox book
| name             = Game Design Workshop: A Playcentric Approach to Creating Innovative Games
| title_orig       = Game Design Workshop: Designing, Prototyping, & Playtesting Games (1st Edition)
| image            = Game Design Workshop 4th Edition.jpg
| image_caption    = 4th Edition cover art
| author           = Tracy Fullerton
| country          =
| language         = 
| series           = 
| subject          = Game design
| publisher        = AK Peters/CRC Press
| pub_date         = 2004, 2008, 2014, 2018
| english_pub_date = 
| media_type       = 
| pages            = 556
| isbn             = 978-1-138-09877-0
| oclc             = 859196163
| dewey            = 
| congress         = 
}}Game Design Workshop '' is a book on game design by Tracy Fullerton, originally published by CMP Books in 2004. It has been updated and released in three subsequent editions, the latest by A K Peters/CRC Press in 2018.

The book is based on the core game design curriculum taught at the USC Interactive Media & Games Division of the USC School of Cinematic Arts. Contributors to the fourth edition include many notable game designers, including: Christina Norman, Keita Takahashi, Anna Anthropy, Randy Smith, Robin Hunicke, Michael John, Asher Vollmer, Elan Lee, Jane McGonigal, Tim LeTourneau, Chaim Gingold, Jenova Chen, Richard Lemarchand, Eric Zimmerman, Frank Lantz, Adrian Hon, Stone Librande, Warren Spector, Kellee Santiago, among others.

Game Design Workshop is cited by numerous sources as one of the "must have" books for new game designers. It is in used in game design courses worldwide.

See also	
List of books on computer and video games

References

External links 
Game Design Workshop, 4th Edition, Publisher site.
Game Design Workshop, 4th Edition site, 4th Edition author site with archived content from old editions.

Books about video games
Video game design